Oak Room may refer to:

Public function rooms
United States
The Oak Room (Algonquin Hotel), a cabaret nightclub in the Algonquin Hotel in New York City
The Oak Room (Plaza Hotel), a restaurant in the Plaza Hotel in New York City
The Oak Room, a function room in the former Greenwich Savings Bank Building in New York City
The Oak Room, a restaurant in the Copley Plaza Hotel in Boston
The Oak Room, a restaurant in the Houstonian Hotel in Houston
The Oak Room, a bar in the Mansions on Fifth Hotel in Pittsburgh
The Oakroom, a restaurant in the Seelbach Hotel in Louisville
The Oak Room, a restaurant in the Pala Casino Resort and Spa near San Diego
United Kingdom
The Oak Room, a restaurant in Le Méridien Piccadilly Hotel in London
The Oak Room, a performance space in The Hospital Club in London
The Oak Room, a restaurant in Danesfield House in Buckinghamshire
The Oak Room, a function room in the Wycombe Swan complex in Buckinghamshire
The Oak Room Cafe in Curzon Community Cinema, Clevedon in North Somerset
Ireland
The Oak Room (Adare Manor), a restaurant at Adare Manor in the village of Adare

Museum rooms and rooms of historical or aesthetic interest
United States
The Oak Room, a state room in Allerton House at Robert Allerton Park in Illinois
The Oak Room, an Elizabethian-style room in Spindletop Hall in Kentucky
Canada
The Oak Room (Casa Loma), a room in Casa Loma in Toronto
The Oak Room, a room in Aberthau House in Vancouver
United Kingdom
The Oak Dining Room, the King's private dining room in Windsor Castle
The Oak Room in the Antelope Hotel in Dorchester, Dorset, a site of the Bloody Assizes
The Great Oak Room, an Elizabethian/Tudor room in the Red Lodge Museum, Bristol
The Oak Room, an Elizabethian room in Chavenage House in Gloucestershire
The Oak Room, the early Tudor great hall of Abington Park Manor in Northampton
The Oak Room, a 17th-century room in New River Head in London
The Oak Room, a room in Cassiobury House in Hertfordshire
The Oak Room, a 19th-century room in Norton Hall in Sheffield
The Oak Room, a room in Scarisbrick Hall in Lancashire featured in the TV series Utopia
The Oak Room, a room in Winnington Hall in Cheshire
The Oak Room, a room in The Olde White Harte in Hull where, according to legend, Sir John Hotham and others made the decision precipitating the Siege of Hull
Oak Hall (formerly the Oak Room), a 19th-century addition to West Dean House in Sussex
The Oak Room, a room in the Liverpool Central Library
The Oak Room, a room in Dyffryn House in Dyffryn Gardens in Wales
The Oak Room, a room in Antrim Castle in Northern Ireland
Ireland
The Oak Room, a room in Malahide Castle near Dublin
The Oak Room, a room in Mansion House, Dublin where Nationalist Party factions met on 17 January 1900

Film and television
The Oak Room (film), a 2020 Canadian film